Pirate Gold typically refers to buried treasure in pirate lore. It may also refer to:

 The Pirate's Gold, a 1908 silent film
 Pirate Gold (1913 film), starring Harry Carey
 Pirate Gold (1920 serial), a film serial directed by George B. Seitz